Christopher Eigeman (born March 1, 1965) is an American actor and film director.

Eigeman is best known for roles in films written and directed by Whit Stillman: Metropolitan (1990), Barcelona (1994), and The Last Days of Disco (1998) as well as Noah Baumbach's Kicking and Screaming (1995), Mr. Jealousy, and Highball (both 1997). He also has made recurring appearances in Malcolm in the Middle, Gilmore Girls,  and Girls.

Personal life
Eigeman was born in Denver, Colorado, in 1965. He attended The Putney School, Putney, Vermont, from 1979 to 1983, and graduated from Kenyon College, Gambier, Ohio, with a Bachelor of Arts in English and Theatre in 1987. He has been married to Linda D. Eigeman since 1993. They have a son, born in 2008.

Career
Eigeman has appeared in theatrical films including Kicking and Screaming (1995), Mr. Jealousy (1997), Highball (1997), Maid in Manhattan (2002), Crazy Little Thing (aka The Perfect You) (2002), The Treatment (2006).

Eigeman has appeared in television series including It's Like, You Know..., Gilmore Girls, Malcolm in the Middle, Homicide: Life on the Street, Fringe, and Girls.

In 1992, Eigeman filmed a pilot for an American version of the British cult sci-fi television show Red Dwarf, playing the part of Arnold Rimmer; however, the show was not picked up as a series.  During the mid-1990s, he appeared in a series of television advertisements for Pacific Bell that highlighted his sarcastic, straight-ahead delivery. In these spots, Eigeman always appeared in dark suit and tie, regardless of the situation.

Eigeman wrote and directed the film Turn the River (2007).

Work

Film

Television

Awards and nominations

References

External links

1965 births
American male film actors
American film directors
American film producers
American male screenwriters
American male television actors
Kenyon College alumni
Living people
Male actors from Denver
Screenwriters from Colorado
The Putney School alumni